Rachel Emma Berry (née Allen) (March 11, 1859 – November 25, 1948) was an American suffragist and politician who in 1914 was elected to a seat in the Arizona House of Representatives to represent Apache County, Arizona.

Family and early life
Rachel Allen was born in Ogden, Utah on March 11, 1859. She grew up in Kanarraville, Utah and taught school there. Rachel married William Berry in 1879.  In the fall of 1881, Rachel and William left for Arizona with a group of 18 other members of the Church of Jesus Christ of Latter-day Saints by covered wagons. They arrived in St. Johns, Arizona on January 27, 1882.

William Berry became a leading rancher and cattleman with the horses and herd of cattle he had brought from Utah. The Berrys had seven children, four daughters and three sons.

Arizona legislator
In 1912, shortly after it became a state, Arizona gave women suffrage, so Arizona's women gained the right to vote eight years before universal suffrage occurred in the United States. Women in Arizona soon after ran for elected office. In 1914 Rachel Berry became one of the first women to win a seat in a State Legislature in the United States. Her term representing Apache County began on  January 11, 1915. During her one term in office, Berry focused on bills that were concerned with education and child welfare, and served as Chairwoman of the Good Roads Committee. She worked to adopt a bill for Arizona's current state flag.

Public service
After she completed her term in the House of Representatives, Berry was appointed the chairman of the Apache County Child Welfare Board. She was president of the local Relief Society and the Mutual Improvement Association of her church. She was the trustee of the school in St. Johns.

Death and legacy
Berry died at her home, in Phoenix, on Thanksgiving Day, 1948. She was inducted into the Arizona Women's Hall of Fame in 1984.

References

Women state legislators in Arizona
Politicians from Ogden, Utah
People from Iron County, Utah
People from St. Johns, Arizona
Members of the Arizona House of Representatives
1859 births
1948 deaths
Latter Day Saints from Utah
20th-century American women politicians
Latter Day Saints from Arizona
20th-century American politicians
19th-century American educators
Educators from Utah
19th-century American women educators